Latifa Akherbach (َ,  – born 1960 in Tetouan) is a Moroccan politician and journalist. Between 2007 and 2012, she was Secretary of State for Foreign Affairs in the cabinet of Abbas El Fassi.

Latifa Akherbach started her career in 1981 as a journalist in the daily "Al Maghrib" and "La Vie Eco" magazine. Sometime in the late 1990s she taught at the "Higher Institute of Journalism of Rabat" and in 2003, she was appointed by King Mohammed VI as the head the "Higher Institute of Information and Communication" ( ISIC), then in 2007 as co-CEO of the SNRT, heading the Moroccan state radio.

Akherbach co-authored two books in French about women rights; "Women and Media" (Femmes et médias) and "Women and Politics" (Femmes et politique).

See also
Cabinet of Morocco

References

Women government ministers of Morocco
1960 births
Living people
Moroccan journalists
Moroccan women journalists
Moroccan radio journalists
Moroccan women radio journalists
People from Tétouan
Moroccan educators
Moroccan women educators
Moroccan writers in French